Wyoming's 3rd State Senate district is one of 30 districts in the Wyoming Senate. It has been represented by Republican Senator Cheri Steinmetz.

List of members representing the district

Recent election results

Federal and statewide results

2006

2010

2014

2018
Republican Cheri Steinmetz was elected with 80% of the vote compared to Democrat Marci Shaver who received 20% of the vote.

References

Wyoming Senate districts